Regency Park may refer to:

 Regency Park, South Australia, a suburb of Adelaide, South Australia
 Regency Park (Cary, North Carolina), United States
 Regency Park Estate, a suburb of Johannesburg, South Africa
 Regency Park Estates, Alberta, Canada
 Regency Park (Omaha), a park in Omaha, Nebraska
 Regency Park (Orlando, Florida), a neighborhood in Pensacola, Florida